is a Japanese former wrestler who competed in the 1984 Summer Olympics.

References

External links
 

1960 births
Living people
Olympic wrestlers of Japan
Wrestlers at the 1984 Summer Olympics
Japanese male sport wrestlers
Asian Games medalists in wrestling
Wrestlers at the 1986 Asian Games
Medalists at the 1986 Asian Games
Asian Games silver medalists for Japan
20th-century Japanese people
21st-century Japanese people